Claudia Angela Jordan is an American talk show host, actress, model, businesswoman and reality television and radio personality. She is known for appearing as a model on the U.S. version of Deal or No Deal and The Price Is Right, and for competing on seasons 2 and 6 of Celebrity Apprentice. Jordan appeared on the Bravo reality television series The Real Housewives of Atlanta for its seventh season.

Early life
Jordan was born in Providence, Rhode Island, to a mother from Italy and an African-American father. Claudia's parents met when her father was in the United States Air Force, stationed in Brindisi, Italy. Jordan was a sprinter and earned all-state honors in track and field while in high school in Rhode Island. Jordan competed in three Junior Olympics and in college became an All-American sprinter in the 400-meter relay.

Career
Jordan held the Miss Rhode Island Teen USA 1990 title and represented Rhode Island at the Miss Teen USA 1990 pageant. In 1997, she won the Miss Rhode Island USA title, becoming the second African-American woman ever to hold that title. She competed at Miss USA 1997 where she placed in the top 10. She appeared in music videos for Backstreet Boys, Ginuwine, Fabolous, Charlie Wilson, Joe, Chico DeBarge, D'Angelo, Coolio, Master P, Ludacris, and Kenny Lattimore. She has worked as a journalist at the Providence American newspaper and in production at the Boston television station WHDH-TV. She has appeared in national television commercials for Coors Light, Sears, Pepsi, Visa, Microsoft, and Mountain Dew.

She appeared as a contestant on Dog Eat Dog. Prior to appearing on Deal or No Deal, Jordan was known as a former Barker's Beauty on the CBS game show The Price Is Right from 2001 to 2003. She appeared on Deal or no Deal holding Case No. 1 for all four seasons.

Jordan appeared on the second season of Celebrity Apprentice. In the series, celebrities raise money for a charity of their choice; Jordan selected the NAPSAC Foundation as her charity. She was later asked to return to compete on the All-Star version of Celebrity Apprentice. She was then hired by Apprentice host Donald Trump to co-host the Miss Universe 2009 pageant from the Bahamas alongside Billy Bush. Jordan's first hosting job was for Fox Sports West as a red carpet correspondent for 54321 and also appeared on The Best Damn Sports Show Period. She then went on E! and The Style Network as the co-host of The Modern Girl's Guide to Life for two seasons. After that she was asked to join BET's late night sports show Ballers with John Salley, Guy Torry and Hugh Douglas. Jordan was also a stand out on the satellite radio show The Foxxhole alongside Jamie Foxx, who then gave her her own weekly show on Sirius/XM Radio on The Foxxhole, called "The Claudia Jordan Show". Jordan also co-hosted on "Reach Around Radio". Jordan was a co-host on Tameka Cottle's talk show Tiny's Tonight alongside Tamar Braxton and rapper Trina. The television pilot aired in December 2012 on VH1. Jordan also hosted the a travel show for AT&T called The Summer of Adventure. In October 2014, it was announced that Jordan would be joining the cast of The Real Housewives of Atlanta as a main housewife for its seventh season while simultaneously working as a co-host on the nationally syndicated Rickey Smiley Morning Show. Jordan also often appears as a contributor on CNN and HLN. She went on to star in TV One's The Next 15 and lead her own morning show in Dallas, The Morning Rush, which was the top rated R&B Morning show in Dallas. She now has her own talk show on a Fox Soul program called Out Loud with Claudia Jordan.

Filmography

Film

Television

Documentary

References

External links

Female models from Rhode Island
American television actresses
American people of Italian descent
Game show models
Living people
1990 beauty pageant contestants
20th-century Miss Teen USA delegates
Actors from Providence, Rhode Island
Miss USA 1997 delegates
African-American actresses
American film actresses
The Real Housewives cast members
Actresses from Rhode Island
The Apprentice (franchise) contestants
20th-century American people
20th-century African-American women
20th-century African-American people
21st-century African-American people
21st-century African-American women
Year of birth missing (living people)